Hermophyllon anceps is a moth in the family Cossidae, and the only species in the genus Hermophyllon. It is found in Malaysia (Sabah), Indonesia (Sumatra, Nias, Kalimantan and Java) and the Philippines.

Etymology
The genus name refers to the Greek god Hermes plus Greek phyllon (meaning leaf).

References

Natural History Museum Lepidoptera generic names catalog

Zeuzerinae
Monotypic moth genera